Southern District Recreation & Sports Assn Ltd, commonly known as Southern and currently known for sponsorship reasons as Kwoon Chung Southern, is a professional football club based in Southern District, Hong Kong. They currently compete in the Hong Kong Premier League.

History
Southern District entered the newly formed Hong Kong Third District Division during the 2002–03 season. However, the team did not reach the Hong Kong Third Division League Final Round and thus did not get promotion in the first few years of their history.

In the 2006–07 season, they reached the Final Round for the first time since the club was formed. They were the runners up of the Third District Division and qualified for the Final Round, however, they could not get promotion as they only managed to gain two points.

In the 2007–08 season, they retained last season's good performance, reached the Final Round again as they were again the 1st runner-up of Third District Division League, 9 points behind Shatin. Unfortunately, they could not gain the promotion again as they were 4 points behind the promotion places.

In the 2008–09 season, they could not qualify for the Final Round as they only placed at 4th of Third District Division.

They were finally promoted to the Hong Kong Second Division for the first time in the 2009–10 season. They were the 1st runner-up of the Third District Division League and competed with the other 3 teams in the Final Round for promotion. Although they only placed at 3rd in the final round, Eastern decided not to accept promotion and the right to be promoted was passed to Southern who did accept.

They successfully avoided relegation and stayed in the Second Division during their first season. They were the 4th out of 12 teams, 10 points behind the champions Sham Shui Po. On the other hand, they won their first trophy since their formation on 9 January 2011. They defeated Double Flower in the final of Hong Kong Junior Shield at Hong Kong Stadium.

They were promoted to the Hong Kong First Division for the first time in the 2011–12 season, as they were the 1st runner-up of the Hong Kong Second Division, three points behind champions Rangers.

They were branded as Royal Southern in the 2013–14 season, and finished 4th out of 12 teams. However, the club chose to self-relegate after the end of the season. 

They returned to the top flight in the 2015–16 season. Starting from this season, the club was rebranded as Kwoon Chung Southern due to sponsorship reasons.

In 2016–17, Southern finished third in the table, their highest position in club history.

Southern matched their table position from 2016–17 with another third-place finish in 2018–19. The club also reached the finals of Hong Kong FA Cup for the first time, losing 2–0 to Kitchee.

Name history 
2002–2013: Southern (南區)
2013–2014: Royal Southern (皇室南區)
2014–2015: Southern (南區)
2015–: Kwoon Chung Southern (冠忠南區)

Stadium

Since 2007, Southern have played their home games at Aberdeen Sports Ground. They began playing their home games there during their days in the Hong Kong Third District Division.

After Southern was promoted to the Hong Kong First Division, the club have continued to use Aberdeen Sports Ground as their home stadium.

In September of 2018, the canopy of the main grandstand at Aberdeen Sports Ground was damaged due to Typhoon Mangkhut. Although a temporary canopy was erected over the opposite grandstand in order to allow Southern to continue to use the stadium for the remainder of the 2018–19 season, the Leisure and Cultural Services Department determined that installation of a new canopy on the main grandstand was to begin in June of 2019. As the renovations were scheduled to last until the end of March 2020, Southern applied to use Mong Kok Stadium as their home stadium for the 2019–20 season.

Team staff
{|class="wikitable"
|-
!Position
!Staff
|-
|Head coach||  Cheng Siu Chung
|-
|Assistant coach|| Pui Ho Wang
|-
|Assistant coach|| Beto Fronza
|-
|Goalkeeping coach|| Fan Chun Yip
|-
|Physiotherapist|| Ella Yeung 
|-
|Physiotherapist|| Fong Ho Kee
|-
|Media Director|| Tse Tak Him
|-
|Fans Club Officer|| Lo Wai Tat
|-
|Fans Club Assistant|| Lam Ho Kwan

Current squad

First team

 FP
 FP
 FP  
 FP 

 FP 
 (on loan from Kitchee)
 (on loan from Kitchee)

 FP 

 

 (on loan from Kitchee)

 (on loan from Kitchee)

 (on loan from Kitchee)

Remarks:
LP These players are registered as local players in Hong Kong domestic football competitions.
FP These players are registered as foreign players.

Reserve team squad

Season-to-season record

Note:

Honours

League
 Hong Kong Second Division
 Runners-up (1): 2011–12

 Hong Kong Third District Division
 Runners-up (3): 2006–07, 2007–08, 2009–10

Cup competitions
Hong Kong FA Cup
 Runners-up (1): 2018–19
Hong Kong Senior Shield
 Runners-up (1): 2015–16
Hong Kong Sapling Cup
 Runners-up (1): 2019–20
 Hong Kong Junior Shield
 Champions (1): 2010–11

Managers
 Cheng Siu Chung (2006–2008)
 Fung Hoi Man (2009–2015)
 Cheng Siu Chung (2015–2020)
 Pui Ho Wang,  Cristiano Cordeiro (2020)
 Zesh Rehman (2020–2022)
 Cheng Siu Chung (2022–)

eSports
Southern District is the first Hong Kong football club of creating an eSports department. By partnering with Nova Esports, they signed Ronnie Yau as a FIFA player and Kevin Lau as a Pro Evolution Soccer player.

External links
 Southern District FC Official Website

References

Football clubs in Hong Kong
Association football clubs established in 2002
2002 establishments in Hong Kong